The 30th Saturn Awards, presented by the Academy of Science Fiction, Fantasy and Horror Films and honoring the best in science fiction, fantasy, horror, and other genres belonging to genre fiction in film, television and home entertainment in 2003, were held on May 5, 2004 at the Sheraton Universal Hotel in Los Angeles, California. The nominations were announced on February 17, 2004.

The five "Best Film" categories were respectively won by X2 (Science Fiction), The Lord of the Rings: The Return of the King (Fantasy), 28 Days Later (Horror), Kill Bill: Volume 1 (Action/Adventure/Thriller Film), and Finding Nemo (Animated). The Lord of the Rings: The Return of the King received the most wins with eight, a record until Avatar won ten at the 36th Saturn Awards in 2010, and most nominations with thirteen (including two Best Actor nominations and three Best Supporting Actor nominations).

This ceremony marked the only time an individual received one single nomination for two different works: James Marsters won Best Supporting Actor on Television for his work on the TV series Buffy the Vampire Slayer and its spin-off series Angel; he portrayed the same character, Spike, in both. Ellen DeGeneres also became the first actress to win an award for voice acting for Finding Nemo, and the third performer to do so after Scott Weinger and Robin Williams at the 19th Saturn Awards in 1993, both for Aladdin (1992).

Below is a complete list of nominees and winners. Winners are highlighted in boldface.

Winners and nominees

Film

Television

Programs

Acting

Home Entertainment

Special Achievement Awards
 Visionary Award: Paul Allen
 Life Career Award: Blake Edwards
 Filmmaker's Showcase Award: Eli Roth
 George Pal Memorial Award: Ridley Scott
 Dr. Donald A. Reed Award: Gale Anne Hurd
 Lifetime Achievement Award: John Williams

Cinescape Genre Face of the Future Awards

References

External links
 

Saturn Awards ceremonies
Saturn
2004 in California
Saturn